Sigismund Vladislavovitch Zaremba (Russian: Сигизмунд Владиславович Заремба, 11 June 1861 Zhytomyr, Volhynian Governorate, Russian Empire – 27 November 1915 Petrograd, Russian Empire) was a Ukrainian and Russian composer of Polish ethnicity, born in Zhytomyr, Ukraine, son of Vladislav Ivanovitch Zaremba, also a composer.

He studied with his father (piano) and Sattel and Alois (cello). From 1896 to 1901 he was director of the Imperial Russian Music Society and conductor of the symphony concerts at Voronesh. After that he lived in St. Petersburg. His compositions, which are distinguished by spontaneity and melodiousness, include a suite for string orchestra, a polonaise for full orchestra, a Slavic dance, a string quartet, piano music, romances, etc.

Discography
 2021: Acte Préalable AP0516 – Zygmunt Zaremba - Chamber Music

See also
Nikolai Zaremba

External links

1861 births
1915 deaths
Musicians from Zhytomyr
Russian composers
Russian male composers
Ukrainian composers